Annahid Dashtgard is an Iranian-born Canadian author, activist and consultant. Her family fled Iran for England in 1980, she later moved to Alberta, Canada. In 2019, she published her memoir Breaking the Ocean: A Memoir of Race, Rebellion, and Reconciliation.

Early life 
Dashtgard was born in Iran to an Iranian father and a British mother. When she was six years old, in 1980, the year after the Iranian Revolution, her family was exiled from Iran and moved to Skellingthorpe, England. She later moved to Canada.

Adult life 
Dashtgard was a leader in anti–corporate globalization movement during the 1990s. Her filming of the 1999 Seattle WTO protests featured in Florence Pastour's art exhibition at the Old Strathcona Arts Barns in December 1999.

Dashtgard is a co-founder the consulting company Anima Leadership. Her 2019 memoir Breaking the Ocean: A Memoir of Race, Rebellion, and Reconciliation deals with themes of depression, post-traumatic stress disorder, and racism.</ref> The book is divided into three sections titled Race, Rebellion, and Reconciliation.

References

External links 

 Annahid Dashtgard shares how she faced discrimination, racism and trauma in her memoir Breaking the Ocean, CBC interview, 2020.

Living people
Iranian women writers
21st-century Canadian women writers
21st-century Canadian writers
Iranian emigrants to England
Iranian emigrants to Canada
Women founders
Organization founders
Canadian activists
Iranian refugees
Year of birth missing (living people)